Tumultuous may refer to:

Tumultuous Petitioning Act 1661
Tumultuous behavior, a form of disorderly conduct

See also
Tumult (disambiguation)